Howard Malcolm Baldrige may refer to:

 Howard M. Baldrige (1894–1985), Nebraska State representative and father to Secretary Howard Malcolm Baldrige
 Howard M. Baldrige Jr. (1922–1987), 26th United States Secretary of Commerce